2018 Austrian Open may refer to:

2018 Austrian Open (table tennis)
2018 Austrian Darts Open